Harry Wright (1835–1895) was an English-born American baseball player, manager and developer.

Harry Wright may also refer to:
Harry Wright (footballer, born 1888) (1888–1950), English footballer best known for playing for West Bromwich Albion, see 1912 FA Cup Final
Harry Wright (footballer, born 1900) (1900–?), English footballer best known for playing for Gillingham
Harry Wright (Australian footballer) (1870–1950), Australian rules footballer
Harry Wright (footballer, born 1909) (1909–1994), English football coach
Harry Wright (Canadian politician) (1875–?), politician in British Columbia, Canada
Harry Wright (Queensland politician) (1890–1963), member of the Queensland Legislative Assembly
Harry N. Wright (1881–1969), president of the City College of New York
Harry Wright (American football) (1919–1993), American football player and coach

See also
Henry Wright (disambiguation)
Harold Wright (disambiguation)